Sankhni also known as Teachers Town is a town in Uttar Pradesh state, India. It's 3 km from Jahangirabad, and at 20 minutes drive from district headquarters Bulandshahr, It is part of the Delhi NCR region.
Town is well connected to Delhi and Noida through state Highways, Supporting easy access to employment, to abundant Education and services for all kinds of matter .

Demographics
The majority of Town, around 98%, are Muslims (Twelver), other communities are also living there freely. Some families moved to Pakistan at the time of the Partition of India and some to Jahangirabad and Aligarh.

Teaching is a Vital source of earning for residents. A large number of teachers are working in Government Sectors in Delhi and Uttar Pradesh.
Farmers use high-tech machines and modern technology for cultivation and Farming.

Education
Sankhni has produced many professionals including teachers, doctors, journalists, Scientists and engineers working in USA, UK, Germany, Gulf, Saudi Arabia and in their native country India. There are a number of government and private schools in Sankhni, so the education standard from primary to Senior secondary level of town is comparable to that of a city. Most of candidates from Sankhni have competed for the competitive exams and have been selected for both government and private sectors.

Both male and female students move from the town for higher studies. The main source for higher education for Sankhni is Aligarh Muslim University, Alfalah University Faridabad, Jamia Millia Islamia, Delhi University, Jamia Hamdard, Chaudhary Charan Singh University, Meerut, UP Board, UPTU, CBSE, NIOS, UGC, ICSC approved and some distance learning Universities.

School/Colleges
Below is list of schools in Sankhni:

 1. HAIDERY INTER COLLEGE
 2. HAIDERY PUBLIC SCHOOL
 5. KANYA JUNIOR HIGH SCHOOL
 6. GOVT JUNIOR HIGH SCHOOL
 7. ISLAMIA PRIMARY MAKTAB SANKHNI
 8. AAL-E-ATHER JUNIOR HIGH SCHOOL
 9. BASIC PRIMARY SCHOOL SANKHNI
 10.BASIC PRIMARY SCHOOL ABBAS NAGAR SANKHNI

NGO's in Sankhni
Many  NGOs (Non-Governmental Organizations) are working in Sankhni to promote social or political change,  These organizations played a critical role in the development of the society. Some of the active organizations in Sankhni are :

 1.Anjuman Haidery
 2. Anjuman Aal-e-Athar 
 3. Ale Athar Educational & Welfare Society.

 These organizations are running 
 various programmes and schools/colleges into the Town.

Mosques/Temples
Sankhni Have Various Mosques and Temples :
 1. Mughal Jama Masjid
 2. Shia Jama Masjid
 3. Kazi Wali Masjid
 4. Masjid Azeem Baig
 5. Masjid Zehra (Darzion Wali)
 6. Masjid Ahle Sunnat
 7. Shiv Mandir
 8. Maharshi Valmiki Mindir

Azadari in Sankhni
 The Mourning of Muharram (also known as the Remembrance of Muharram or Muharram Observances) is a set of commemoration rituals observed by Shia Muslims, as well as some non-Muslims. The commemoration falls in Muharram, the first month of the Islamic calendar. Many of the events associated with the ritual take place in congregation halls known as Hussainia. 
The event marks the anniversary of the Battle of Karbala (AD 680/AH 61), when Imam Hussein ibn Ali, a grandson of Prophet Muhammad, was killed by the forces of the second Umayyad caliph. Family members and companions accompanying him were killed or subjected to humiliation. The commemoration of this event during the yearly mourning season, with the Day of Ashura as the focal date, serves to define Shia communal identity. Muharram observances are carried out in countries with a sizable Shia population. 
Shia Muslims mourn during Muharram, although Sunnis and Non Muslims do so to as much lesser extent.  
Sankhni is well known for Azadari and Muharram Juloos,for example 
Sham-e Ghariban shab-e dari/Majlis on the eve of every 11th muharram at Karbala.
 
Town have many Dargah and Karbala. 
 Dargah Baitul Murad Hussainiya
 Dargah Shah -e-Najaf
 Dargah Babul Murad
 Babe Zehra
 Karbala

Cities and towns in Bulandshahr district